Never Trust a Gambler is a 1951 American film noir crime film directed by Ralph Murphy and starring Dane Clark, Cathy O'Donnell and Tom Drake.

Plot
Steve Garry, insisting he has quit gambling, asks his ex-wife Virginia Merrill if he can lay low at her Los Angeles house while waiting to testify in a murder trial. She reluctantly consents, unsure whether she can trust him, and hides him from nosy neighbor Phoebe.

At a market buying Steve food and liquor, Virginia runs into a police sergeant, McCloy, who dated Dolores Alden, her former roommate. McCloy won't go away, escorting Virginia home, then making a drunken pass at her. Steve emerges from hiding and hits McCloy with a chair, accidentally killing him.

Sgt. Ed Donovan has been out looking for Steve, who is actually a suspect in that murder case coming to trial. Donovan is called to the scene when McCloy's body is found near a car that's gone off a cliff. Steve pushed it there, hoping to make it look like the cop drove drunk and caused his own death. McCloy's partner Lou Brecker investigates as well. Donovan finds the name of Dolores on the body and questions her, which in turns leads him to her friend Virginia.

Steve flees, taking Virginia along by force. While avoiding roadblocks, they pull into a gas station, where Virginia leaves a note for an attendant to find. As the cops close in, Steve takes off on foot, climbing a crane and wounding Donovan with a gunshot. As he tries to descend, Steve is tripped by Donovan and plummets to his death.

Cast
 Dane Clark as Steve
 Cathy O'Donnell as Virginia
 Tom Drake as Sgt. Donovan
 Jeff Corey as Lou Brecker
 Myrna Dell as Dolores
 Rhys Williams as Sgt. McCloy
 Kathryn Card as Phoebe

External links

Never Trust a Gambler at TCMDB

1951 films
American crime drama films
Columbia Pictures films
1951 crime drama films
American black-and-white films
Films directed by Ralph Murphy
1950s English-language films
1950s American films